The Thoroughbred Club Stakes is a Melbourne Racing Club Group 3 Thoroughbred horse race, for three-year-old fillies, at set weights with penalties, over a distance of 1200 metres, held annually at Caulfield Racecourse in Melbourne, Australia in October. Total prize money for the race is A$200,000.

History
The race was first run as the Maroona Handicap in 1957 and won by New Light, who was ridden by the champion jockey George Moore. The race has since been held on the first day of the MRC Spring Carnival.

Name
1957–1976 - Maroona Handicap 
1976 onwards - Thoroughbred Club Stakes

Distance
1957–1962 - 5½ furlongs (~1100 metres)
1963–1971 -  6 furlongs (~1200 metres)
1972–1973 - 1200 metres
1974–1999 - 1400 metres
2000 onwards - 1200 metres

Grade
1976–1978 - Principal race
1979 onwards - Group 3

Winners 

 2021 - Sneaky Five
 2020 - Swats That
 2019 - California Zimbol
 2018 - Sunlight
 2017 - Invincible Star
 2016 - Hear The Chant
 2015 - Serene Majesty
 2014 - Earthquake
 2013 - Missy Longstocking
 2012 - Cavalry Rose
 2011 - Platelet
 2010 - Solar Charged
 2009 - Avenue
 2008 - Damselfly
 2007 - Gamble Me
 2006 - Splashing Out
 2005 - Queen Of The Hill
 2004 - Emlozza
 2003 - Crown Princess
 2002 - Innovation Girl
 2001 - Patterns
 2000 - Arrabeea
 1999 - Camargue
 1998 - Speedy Kids
 1997 - Cornwall Queen
 1996 - Flaming Heart
 1995 - Vigil
 1994 - Verocative
 1993 - Cairncross
 1992 - Googs Dream
 1991 - Cushion
 1990 - Mammy
 1989 - Lady Of Perfection
 1988 - Boardwalk Angel
 1987 - Imposera
 1986 - Why Julie
 1985 - Tonephil
 1984 - Delightful Belle
 1983 - Fear Burst
 1982 - Sovereign Palace
 1981 - Voli Dream
 1980 - Biscadale
 1979 - Lady's Slipper
 1978 - Just Landed
 1977 - Miss Expensive
 1976 - Happy Kitten
 1975 - † Vamp / Silver Sari
 1974 - Honoured
 1973 - † Orinthos / Fulmina
 1972 - Make Mine Roses
 1971 - † Abinger / Tina's Joy
 1970 - Intention
 1969 - Via
 1968 - Threat 

† Run in Divisions

See also
 List of Australian Group races
 Group races

References

Horse races in Australia